Secret Wars is a 2014 Polish action film directed by Patryk Vega.

Cast 
 Olga Bołądź – Aleksandra Lach 'Bialko'
 Janusz Chabior – Marian Bońka
 Wojciech Zieliński – Janusz Cerat
  – Romuald Światło
 Andrzej Grabowski – prior
  – Rafun

References

External links 

2014 action films
Polish action films